Kevin Byrne is the 6th County Executive of Putnam County, NY and is a former state legislator of the  New York State Assembly where he served for three terms. He is a registered Republican.

As Putnam County Executive, Byrne is both the Chief Executive Officer and Chief Financial Officer of Putnam County government.  He serves as a national executive board member of the American City County Exchange (ACCE) (Nov. 2022 - Present), board member of the New York Metropolitan Transportation Council (NYMTC) (Jan. 2023 - Present), board member of the East of Hudson Watershed Corporation (Jan. 2023 - Present), and is an active member of the County Executives of America (CEA), New York State Association of Counties (NYSAC), and New York State County Executives Association (NYSCEA).

During his tenure in the Assembly, Byrne served as the ranking member on the Assembly Health Committee (2020 - 2022), chairperson of the Assembly Minority Conference Program Committee (2020–2022), co-chair of the Assembly Minority Conference Task Force on Critical Infrastructure and Transportation (2018-2019), ranking member of the Assembly Aging Committee (2017-2018), and vice chair of minority steering (2019). Byrne also served on the Assembly Ways & Means, Governmental Operations, Insurance, Labor, and Transportation Committees.

From 2018 - 2022, Byrne served as the New York State chair of the American Legislative Exchange Council (ALEC).

Life and career
Byrne was born and raised in the Hudson Valley and attended Carmel High School before enrolling at the University of Scranton. As a high school student, he earned the rank of Eagle Scout.  At Scranton, Byrne completed the academic portion of the Army ROTC program supported by an internship with then Congresswoman Sue Kelly. However, was ultimately unable to qualify and serve in the Army due to two previous spinal surgeries.

Following his graduation from the University of Scranton in 2007, Byrne returned to the Hudson Valley and served as a member of the Putnam Valley Planning Board and as a Firefighter/EMT with the Kent Volunteer Fire Department where he served three terms as the department’s president.  He later served as Deputy District Director to Congresswoman Nan Hayworth and then as a Regional Director for the American Heart Association while finishing his M.P.A. concentrating in Healthcare Administration at Marist College. Prior to running for public office, he also worked in healthcare administration assisting the Senior Director of Clinical Operations at CareMount Medical, which at the time was the largest private multi-specialty medical group in New York state.

Byrne won his first bid seeking elected office in 2016 when he was elected as the Assemblyman for New York’s 94th Assembly District.

Assemblyman Byrne lives in Mahopac with his wife Briana, a Physician Assistant, their young son Braeden.

Assembly Record & Accomplishments 
During his first term in the Assembly, Byrne voted against every tax increase proposed in the Assembly. This is a primary reason why Byrne was recognized in 2017 as one of five state legislators with the highest rating by the Conservative Party of New York State.

In 2019 Byrne was honored with the “Defender of Life” Award by the Westchester-Putnam Right to Life Committee. In 2020 he received the “Guardian of Small Business” Award from the NFIB, in addition to being named as one of GOPAC’s 2020 emerging leaders.

During his first term, Byrne introduced and passed ten bills in the Assembly, eight of which passed the Senate and were signed into law by the governor, more than most other freshmen members during that time. During his three terms in the Legislature, Byrne introduced and passed over twenty bills that have been signed into law by either Governor Andrew Cuomo or Governor Kathy Hochul.

Some brief examples of Byrne’s legislation in the Assembly included:

 Honoring the actions of a local Yorktown military hero by designating a portion of state roadway the Major Clayton Carpenter Memorial Highway.
 Designating various local lakes as inland waterways to improve eligibility for state grants
 Loosening a residency requirement for the town of Somers to help recruitment and retention efforts for specific public employee positions that serve the town.
Making New York more welcoming to a new business  by allowing a potential distillery project to both develop and sell alcohol. The reported planned investment into the district by the businesses is $40 million, and would bring  revenue for the county, town, school districts, in addition to jobs and new economic activity to the region.
 Granting forgiveness for ministerial errors made by a local school district saving the district millions of dollars owed from penalties and previous school aid (initially vetoed by Gov. Cuomo but identical bill language was later included and passed in 2020-2021 FY budget which Byrne opposed for unrelated reasons)
 Increasing awareness about Atomic Veterans, an essential but sadly under-recognized group, through naming a large multi-million dollar pedestrian bridge over the Taconic State Parkway in Westchester County after the state’s Atomic Veterans. The general lack of awareness regarding America’s Atomic Veterans is largely due to the fact that these veterans were prohibited from sharing stories about their work, due to its top secret nature, until it was declassified in 1996 by the U.S. Congress.

Some other examples of legislation co-sponsored by Byrne that became law include:
 Strengthened the Clean Indoor Air Act (Byrne was the only GOP Assembly member to co-sponsor this legislation) 
Prohibited the practice of conversion "therapy" on minors (Byrne was the only Republican legislator to co-sponsor this legislation)
 Increased access to Automated External Defibrillators
 Better benefits for combat veterans
 Increased access to Epinephrine Auto-injectors
Expanded cancer coverage for volunteer firefighters
Created new revenue streams for local fire departments from reimbursement for EMS services

COVID-19 Pandemic & Cuomo's Nursing Home Coverup 
In January 2020, as a member of the state Assembly, Byrne was appointed Ranking Minority Member of the Assembly Health Committee by Assembly Minority Leader Will Barclay. Less than three months later, New York State had its first confirmed positive case of COVID-19, and New York's health system was tested in an unprecedented manner.

Throughout the pandemic, while Byrne and many of his legislative colleagues supported efforts to provide resources to front line workers, researchers, and medical providers, he also highlighted disparities in treatment and spoke out publicly to protect individual rights and liberties, including a person's First Amendment right to peaceably assemble. As the pandemic became increasingly politicized by both political parties and Governor Cuomo admonished the federal government, Byrne spoke up thanking the federal government for its support and highlighted the Governor's own pandemic shortcomings, including its failed interventions regarding nursing homes.

As numerous scandals unraveled around Andrew Cuomo's administration, Byrne was a loud vocal critic. He called for hearings into the state's pandemic response in elder care facilities, demanded transparency in COVID-19 nursing home data, and ultimately called for an impeachment investigation into Governor Cuomo for his response and subsequent coverup of the state's handling of the virus in nursing homes. His criticism grew as numerous other Cuomo scandals arose involving Cuomo's controversial pandemic book deal, misuse of taxpayer resources, and multiple allegations of sexual misconduct. Byrne's work garnered him national attention as a guest on Fox News, Fox Business, Newsmax, Daily Caller, and the Daily Wire.

Ultimately, the bipartisan coalition against Andrew Cuomo grew to a point where calls for his resignation spread across the state including from top Democrat officials U.S. Senators Charles Schumer and Kiersten Gillibrand. This was bolstered by a critical report released by NYS Attorney General Leticia James confirming that Governor Cuomo's administration had under-reported nursing home related deaths in an nontransparent manner. The Assembly Judiciary Committee ultimately enacted an impeachment investigation.  Shortly after Assembly Speaker Carl Heastie and Judiciary Chairman Charles Lavine made it clear it would release the committee's findings, the Governor announced his resignation.

Honors 
2022 Putnam County Land Trust Honoree

2021 Irish Echo 40 under 40

2020 Guardian of Small Business by the NFIB

2020 Emerging Leader of GOPAC

2020 Distinguished Citizenship Award by Brewster Elks

2019 Saint Michael the Archangel “Defender of Life” Award by Westchester-Putnam Right to Life

2017 Rising Star of the New York State Republican Party

2017 Highest rating by the Conservative Party of New York State

2017 Wheeler Milmoe Assembly Member of the Year Award by New York State Young Republicans

2016 New York Assembly campaign 
In 2016, Assemblyman Steve Katz announced that he would not seek another term.  Byrne was one of five Republicans that announced they would seek the nomination to replace Katz. At the local Republican Convention, Byrne received 14,562 weighted votes (76%) over Somers Town Councilman Bill Faulkner's 3,681 (19%) and Carmel Councilwoman Suzanne McDonough's 974 (5%).  Councilwoman McDonough immediately pledged she would continue a primary campaign.

A day after winning his party’s endorsement, Byrne was injured in a Brewster auto accident, breaking his right knee and suffering other injuries when another car, traveling at high speed, crossed into his lane, he said, and collided with him head-on.  Byrne continued his campaign throughout his recovery and would later be victorious during the Republican primary, defeating McDonough 60% to 40%. He won the 2016 general election over Democrat Brian Higbie in the 2016 general election with 61% of the vote.

2018 New York Assembly campaign
In 2018, Byrne was challenged by Vedat Gashi, a Yorktown resident and real estate attorney.

During the campaign, a debate at the Putnam League of Women Voters Forum became contentious due to a dispute between the candidates about whether Byrne had supported legislation that would prevent violent domestic abusers from obtaining firearms, commonly referred to as the “Domestic Violence Escalation Protection Act” (Assembly bill A5025). Byrne voted in favor of the bill in question (A5025) twice.

Throughout the campaign, Byrne argued that his effectiveness was shown by his record of passing more legislation than nearly any other freshmen lawmaker in the state (of the 20+ freshmen legislators only 3 freshmen Democrats passed more). Gashi argued that he could deliver more for the district by being a member of the majority Democratic conference.

Gashi’s campaign outspent Byrne’s campaign by more than four times, spending more than $250,000 compared to Byrne's approximately $65,000.

The same election year, the state Senate flipped to Democratic control. This was in part due to the loss of a Republican held Senate seat that largely overlapped with the 94th Assembly District. In a year that proved challenging for many Republicans across the state, Byrne won his bid for re-election by a double digit margin.

2020 New York Assembly campaign 
In 2020, Byrne was challenged by first time candidate Stephanie Keegan (D), a Somers resident who had recently worked as an insurance billing auditor for CareMount Medical.

Keegan ran solely on the Democratic Party Line. Byrne ran on the Republican, Conservative, Independence, Reform, and Rebuild Our State Lines.

The 2020 election produced a record breaking turnout across the country with an unprecedented amount of absentee ballots turned in.

Byrne won with 41,681 votes (62% of the vote), receiving more votes for that Assembly District than any other candidate recorded in history according to the state board of elections website.

2022 Putnam County Executive campaign 
In November 2021, Byrne announced his candidacy for the position of County Executive for Putnam County, running under the Republican Party.  The incumbent executive at the time, Maryellen Odell, was unable to run for re-election after three consecutive terms due to term limits.

Byrne initially faced fierce opposition from the incumbent establishment within his own political party as Maryellen Odell and the Putnam County Republican Party Chairman Anthony Scannapieco publicly endorsed outgoing county legislator Carl Albano for the post. Other senior party officials from the county appeared to follow suit as the sheriff and numerous other county legislators seemingly backed Albano at his announcement.

Prior to the Putnam County GOP Committee’s convention the Conservative Party endorsed Byrne. As it became clear that Byrne was more competitive than initially thought, Scannapieco wrote a series of scathing letters attacking Byrne for his decision to run. The effort by Scannapieco and Odell backfired and Byrne won the convention 148 - 76.

Following the results of the convention, Scannapieco immediately publicly pledged his support for Byrne as the Republican candidate.  While there was initial talk of a Republican Primary, it stopped as Albano too pledged he would support Byrne. Surprisingly, no Democratic candidate surfaced to run for the open position.

Byrne won the November election to become the 6th County Executive of Putnam County, NY with 28,621 votes (99% of the total votes cast), more than any candidate for county executive in the county’s history according to the Putnam County Board of Elections’ website.

References

External links
New York State Assemblyman Kevin M. Byrne official site

Living people
Republican Party members of the New York State Assembly
21st-century American politicians
1984 births
People from Carmel, New York
University of Scranton alumni
Marist College alumni